The Urrao Fault is a sinistral oblique strike-slip fault in the department of Antioquia in northwestern Colombia.

Etymology 
The fault is named after Urrao.

Description 
This set of two parallel faults extend along the axis of the Western Ranges of the Colombian Andes, close to the valleys of the Anacosca and Penderisco Rivers, and the plateau of the Frontino Páramo. Located to the west of the city of Medellín, the faults mainly displace Tertiary sedimentary rocks. The west branch of the fault has mainly normal slip as observed from offset alluvial terraces. The fault forms spectacular fault scarps on terraces. Most of the fault trace has a moderate alignment of topographic features, such as linear streams and offset spurs. Quaternary alluvial sediments of the Penderisco River are offset an unknown amount.

See also 

 List of earthquakes in Colombia
 Abriaquí Fault
 Cañasgordas Fault
 Romeral Fault System

References

Bibliography

Maps

Further reading 
 

Seismic faults of Colombia
Strike-slip faults
Normal faults
Inactive faults
Faults